Hallı may refer to:

 Hallı, Alaplı, Turkey
 Hallı, İskilip, Turkey

See also
 Hallie (disambiguation)
 Halli (disambiguation)